Hatzis or Chatzis is a Greek surname with the female version being Hatzi or Chatzi. The name is derived from the honorific prefix Hatzi- designating people who visited the Holy Land. Notable people with the name include:

Guido Hatzis, Greek-Australian comic character
Efthimios Hatzis, Greek-American Film director
Michalis Chatzis (born 1978), Greek footballer
Nikos Chatzis (born 1976), Greek basketball player
Tony Hatzis (born 1986), Australian footballer
Vassileios Chatzis (1870–1915), Greek painter best known for his seascapes
Dimitrios Hatzis (1913-1981), novelist and journalist.

Greek-language surnames
Surnames